is a railway station on the Shinetsu Main Line in the city of Jōetsu, Niigata, Japan, operated by East Japan Railway Company (JR East).

Lines
Jōgehama Station is served by the Shin'etsu Main Line, and is 14.0 kilometers from the terminus of the line at Naoetsu Station.

Station layout
The station consists of two opposed side platforms, connected by a footbridge. The station is unattended.

Platforms

History
The station opened on 15 July 1952. With the privatization of Japanese National Railways (JNR) on 1 April 1987, the station came under the control of JR East.

Surrounding area
 Jōgehama Onsen

See also
 List of railway stations in Japan

External links

 JR East station information 

Railway stations in Niigata Prefecture
Railway stations in Japan opened in 1952
Stations of East Japan Railway Company
Shin'etsu Main Line
Jōetsu, Niigata